Burmannia is a genus of moths of the family Crambidae. It contains only one species, Burmannia marmorellus, which is found in China (Sichuan).

References

Crambinae
Taxa described in 1901